Bir Hakeim is an oasis in Libya.

Bir Hakeim can also refer to:-

Bir-Hakeim (Paris Métro), a station on the Paris Metro
Pont de Bir-Hakeim, a bridge in Paris
Battle of Bir Hakeim, during the Second World War